In insect anatomy, the juxta is an organ in the males of most Lepidoptera (i.e. moths and butterflies) that supports the aedeagus, the organ used for reproduction in insects. The juxta is located between the two valvae.
Juxta has also been used to refer to a similar structure in  fleshflies.

The term comes from the Latin iuxta, meaning alongside. The biological use of the term should not be confused with the more general use of juxta- as a prefix.

References

Lepidopterology
Insect anatomy